CHRISTUS St. Vincent Regional Medical Center is a general hospital located in Santa Fe, New Mexico, United States. The hospital is the oldest in the State of New Mexico, since being established in the downtown plaza before it was moved in 1977 to developing St. Michaels Drive. It is the largest medical facility north of Albuquerque and the largest south of Pueblo, Colorado. It is the only Level III Trauma Center in Northern New Mexico. It is now the center of a network of over 30 locations, including urgent care locations, family medicine centers, surgical center, cancer care, and women's specialty clinics. See list below.

A religious institution until it became public in 1973, it joined the Christus Health network of Catholic hospitals in 2008. In 2018, the culmination of a $44 million expansion is resulting in all-private patient rooms, which was the most-requested feature in a 2014 survey of the local area population.

Services and clinics 
 Behavioral Health
 Brain and Spine (Neurosurgery)
 Cancer Center
 Digestive Health (Gastroenterology)
 Emergency
 Urgent Care
 Health Gym (Center for Living Well)
 Heart and Vascular
 Hospitalist
 Infectious Disease
 Laboratory
 Labor and Delivery
 Orthopaedic
 Outpatient Therapy (Sports Medicine)
 Pediatric
 Physical Rehab (Inpatient Rehab)
 Pulmonary and Critical Care
 Radiology and Imaging
 Sleep
 Surgical
 Urology
 Weight Loss Surgery Program (Bariatrics)
 Women's Health
 Wound Care and Hyperbaric Oxygen Therapy
 Breast Institute
 Geriatrics and Internal Medicine
 Health Specialists – Los Alamos
 Heart and Vascular Center
 Neurosurgical Associates
 Orthopedics and Sports Medicine Associates
 Orthopedics of New Mexico
 Physical Medicine and Rehabilitation Specialists
 Pulmonary and Critical Care Associates
 Regional Cancer Center
 Sports Medicine – Los Alamos
 Surgical Associates
 Urology Associates
 Women's Care Specialists
 Dermatology

Notes

Buildings and structures in Santa Fe, New Mexico
Hospitals established in 1865
Hospitals in New Mexico
Hospital buildings completed in 1977